Alfred Hubert William Hacker (4 July 1912 – 15 December 1970) was an Australian rules footballer who played for the North Melbourne Football Club in the Victorian Football League (VFL).

Notes

External links 

1912 births
1970 deaths
Australian rules footballers from New South Wales
North Melbourne Football Club players